The 141st Field Artillery Regiment (Washington Artillery) is a United States field artillery regiment.

History
The 141st Field Artillery is an historic American military unit that is currently part of the Louisiana Army National Guard headquartered in New Orleans, Louisiana. It traces its lineage to a militia artillery battery back to 1838, and its heritage includes substantial combat service in several major wars. It earned the Presidential Unit Citation (US) for its service in World War II.

The Washington Artillery was founded on 7 September 1838, as the Washington Artillery Company. It received its regimental flag in August 1846 after serving under Zachary Taylor in the Mexican–American War.

26 May 1861 the Unit was mustered into the American Civil War; four companies served in the Army of Northern Virginia and a fifth was in the Army of Tennessee. Elements of the Washington Artillery participated in over sixty major actions. A few notable engagements include: Battle of Antietam, Battle of Perryville, Battle of Gettysburg, Battle of Shiloh, Battle of Chickamauga, Battle of Fredericksburg, First Battle of Manassas, and the Battle of Cold Harbor.

After the Civil War, it was reorganized as an independent unit called the "Louisiana Volunteer Field Artillery" where it served the United States in the occupation of Cuba. It later was called into service to protect the Mexican border in 1916. A year later it received the designation 141st Artillery. In early 1941, the 141st Field Artillery was mobilized for World War II where it earned the Presidential Unit Citation; a duplicate unit was formed, the 935th Field Artillery Battalion, with both serving in Europe and North Africa. The anti-tank batteries of the battalion were separated in mid-1941, and formed the 773rd Tank Destroyer Battalion.

On 1 July 1959, the 141st and 935th Field Artillery Battalions were consolidated with Headquarters and Headquarters Battery, 204th Antiaircraft Artillery Group, 527th Antiaircraft Artillery Battalion, and the 219th Antiaircraft Artillery Detachment to form the 141st Artillery, a parent regiment under the Combat Arms Regimental System to consist of the 1st, 2nd, and 3rd Howitzer Battalions, elements of the 39th Infantry Division, the 4th Automatic Weapons Battalion, and the 5th Detachment. The 141st Artillery was redesignated on 1 May 1972 as the 141st Field Artillery to consist of the 1st Battalion, an element of the 256th infantry Brigade. It was withdrawn 30 June 1986 from the Combat Arms Regimental System and reorganized under the United States Army Regimental System.

In 2004 through 2005 and again in 2010, the 141st FA as part of the 256th Infantry Brigade mobilized to Baghdad, Iraq, in support of Operations Iraqi Freedom and New Dawn.

On 29 August 2005, Hurricane Katrina struck the Gulf Coast of Louisiana and Mississippi while most members of the Washington Artillery were still serving their final weeks of deployment in Iraq. Following the return of the battalion to Louisiana, a detachment immediately mobilized to New Orleans to aid law enforcement with rescue efforts. With the help of the Louisiana State Police, those efforts transitioned into a support mission for the New Orleans Police Department. Joint Task Force Gator was created to help combat the rise of looting and other crimes resulting from the loss of law enforcement officers in the New Orleans area. After three-and-a-half years of assisting local police and patrolling the city, the task force was released from duty on 28 February 2009.

Regimental colors and streamers
Regimental colors of the Washington Artillery

 Presidential Unit Citation
 Meritorious Unit Commendation
These are the Campaign streamers awarded to the Regiment:

Mexican–American War
 Streamer without inscription

American Civil War

 First Manassas
 Mississippi River
 Peninsula 1862
 Shiloh 1862
 Second Manassas
 Sharpsburg
 Fredericksburg
 Murfreesborough
 Chancellorsville

 Gettysburg
 Chickamauga
 Chattanooga
 Atlanta
 Cold Harbor
 Petersburg
 Franklin
 Nashville
 Appomattox

World War I
 Streamer without inscription

World War II

 Algeria-French Morocco
 Anzio
 Ardennes-Alsace
 Central Europe 1945
 Naples-Foggia
 Normandy
 North Apennines

 Northern France 1944
 Po Valley
 Rhineland
 Rome-Arno
 Sicily
 Southern France 1944
 Tunisia

Operation Iraqi Freedom
 Iraqi Governance

Current

The 141st Field Artillery currently consists of the 1st Battalion, 141st Field Artillery. It is assigned as the fires battalion for the 256th Infantry Brigade Combat Team of the Louisiana Army National Guard headquartered in the famed Jackson Barracks.

Commanders

CPT Elisha L. Tracy (Washington Artillery Company)
CPT Henry Forno (1st Company Native American Artillery)
CPT Isaac F. Stocton (Company "A" Washington Infantry)
CPT Joseph E. Ealer (Washington Artillery Company)
CPT R.O. Smith
LT Rinaldo Banister Sr.
CPT Augustus A. Soria
CPT H.I. Hunting
COL James B. Walton (Washington Artillery BN – CSA)
COL Benjamin F. Eshleman
COL John B. Walton (Post-Reconstruction)
COL William M. Owen
COL John B. Richardson
MAJ William D. Gardiner
COL Thomas McCabe-Hyman
MAJ Allison Owen
CPT Luther E. Hall (141 Field Artillery)
MAJ Guy Molony
MAJ Raymond H. Fleming (2nd BN Field Artillery)
LTC Henry Curtis (141 Sep BN Field Artillery – Motorized)
LTC Edward P. Benezech Sr. (1st BN, 141 FA Regiment)
LTC Thurber G. Rickey (2nd BN, 141 FA Regiment)
LTC Bernard Rausch (141 FA – WWII)
LTC Duncan Gillis (141 FA – HQ and SVC Battery)
LTC Numa P. Avendano (935th and 2nd BN 141 FA)
LTC Ragnvald B. Rordam (141 Artillery BN)
LTC Louis O. D'Amico (935th and 2nd BN 141 FA)
LTC Armand J. Duplantier Jr. (1st and 2nd BN 141 FA), descendant of Armand Duplantier (1753-1827), aide-de-camp to General Lafayette
LTC Pierre J. Bouis (1st and 3rd BN 141 FA)
LTC William B. Cox (4th BN 141 FA)
LTC Cecil A Haskins (4th BN 141 FA)
LTC Edward P. Benezech Jr. (2nd BN 141 FA)
LTC Vincent Beninate (4th BN 141 FA)
LTC Douglas Ruello (2nd BN 141 FA)
LTC Thomas P. Breslin (1st BN 141 FA – 105mm Towed)
LTC Emile J. St. Pierre
LTC Charles A. Bourgeois Jr.
LTC Richard J. Gregory
MAJ Silton J. Constance (155mm SP)
LTC Harry M Bonnet
LTC Russel A Mayeur Sr.
LTC Urban B. Martinez Jr.
LTC Rene' C. Jacques
LTC Urban B. Martinez Jr.
LTC Ronald A. Waller
LTC Glenn M. Appe
LTC Ivan M. Jones Jr.
LTC Thomas W. Acosta Jr.
LTC John R. Hennigan Jr.
MAJ Russell L. Hooper (155mm "Paladin")
LTC Jonathan T. Ball
LTC Jordan T. Jones
LTC Brian P. Champagne (105mmT Infantry UA)
LTC Steven M. Finney
LTC Kenneth T. Baillie
MAJ Jarod W. Martin 
LTC Joseph M. Barnett
LTC Christopher S. McElrath
LTC Christian T. Cannon (current commander) 

Command Sergeants Major
CSM Remy Poirrier
CSM Ernest Simoneaux
CSM Frank Appel
CSM Adam Robatham
CSM Jules ST. Germain
CSM Gerald Leonick
CSM Melvin Laurent
CSM William Schmidt
CSM Robert Smith
CSM Patrick Tyrell
CSM Henry Wellmeyer
CSM Harold Butler
CSM Robert Stiefvater
CSM Clifford Ockman
CSM Darrel Graf
CSM Edward Daigle
CSM Jimmy Vicellio
CSM Matthew Drees
CSM Jimmy Hankins
CSM James Booth

References

External links
Louisiana National Guard 1/141 Official Home Page (No Longer Updated)
1/141st Field Artillery (Washington Artillery) Unofficial Home Page
Washington Artillery of New Orleans
Washington Artillery Veterans Association
141st FA Distinctive Unit Insignia @ The Institute of Heraldry
Washington Artillery History Page (Unofficial)
Washington Artillery Early Uniforms (Unofficial) 
Washington Artillery Service Record / History (Archived 2009-10-19)*"The Washington Artillery, 5th Company, at the Battle of Perryville" – Article by Civil War historian/author Bryan S. Bush

141
141
Military units and formations in Louisiana
Military units and formations established in 1838
United States Army regiments of World War I